In algebra, a flat module over a ring R is an R-module M such that taking the tensor product over R with M preserves exact sequences. A module is faithfully flat if taking the tensor product with a sequence produces an exact sequence if and only if the original sequence is exact.

See also flat morphism.

Definition
A module  over a ring  is flat if the following condition is satisfied: for every injective linear map  of -modules, the map

is also injective, where  is the map
induced by 

For this definition, it is enough to restrict the injections  to the inclusions of finitely generated ideals into .

(This is an equivalent definition since the tensor product is a right exact functor.)

Characterizations

An -module  is flat if and only if, for every linear relation

This allow rewriting the previous characterization in terms of homomorphisms, as follows.

An  -module  is flat if and only if the following condition holds: for every map  where  is a finitely generated free -module, and for every finitely generated -submodule  of  the map  factors through a map  to a free -module  such that

Relations to other module properties 

Flatness is related to various other module properties, such as being free, projective, or torsion-free. In particular, every flat module is torsion-free, every projective module is flat, and every free module is projective. 

There are finitely generated modules that are flat and not projective. However, finitely generated flat modules are all projective over the rings that are most commonly considered. 

This is partly summarized in the following graphic.

Torsion-free modules

Every flat module is torsion-free. This results from the above characterization in terms of relations by taking 

The converse holds over the integers, and more generally over principal ideal domains and Dedekind rings.

An integral domain over which every torsion-free module is flat is called a Prüfer domain.

Free and projective modules

A module  is projective if and only if there is a free module  and two linear maps  and  such that  In particular, every free module is projective (take  and 

Every projective module is flat. This can be proven from the above characterizations of flatness and projectivity in terms of linear maps by taking  and 

Conversely, finitely generated flat modules are projective under mild conditions that are generally satisfied in commutative algebra and algebraic geometry. This makes the concept of flatness useful mainly for modules that are not finitely generated.

A finitely presented module (that is the quotient of a finitely generated free module by a finitely generated submodule) that is flat is always projective.

Over a Noetherian ring, every finitely generated flat module is projective, since every finitely generated module is finitely presented. The same result is true over an integral domain, even if it is not Noetherian.

On a local ring every finitely generated flat module is free.

A finitely generated flat module that is not projective can be built as follows. Let  be the set of the infinite sequences whose terms belong to a fixed field . It is a commutative ring with addition and multiplication defined componentwise. This ring is absolutely flat (that is, every module is flat). The module  where  is the ideal of the sequences with a finite number of nonzero terms, is thus flat and finitely generated (only one generator), but it is not projective.

Non-examples

 If  is an ideal in a Noetherian commutative ring , then  is not a flat module, except if  is generated by an idempotent (that is an element equal to its square). In particular, if  is an integral domain,  is flat only if  equals  or is the zero ideal.

 Over an integral domain, a flat module is torsion free. Thus a module that contains nonzero torsion elements is not flat.

Direct sums, limits and products
A direct sum  of modules is flat if and only if each  is flat.

A direct limit of flat is flat. In particular, a direct limit of free modules is flat. Conversely, every flat module can be written as a direct limit of finitely-generated free modules.

Direct products of flat modules need not in general be flat. In fact, given a ring , every direct product of flat -modules is flat if and only if  is a coherent ring (that is, every finitely generated ideal is finitely presented).

Flat ring extensions 
A ring homomorphism  is flat if   is a flat -module for the module structure induced by the homomorphism.

For example,  is flat and not projective over 

Localization 
In this section,  denotes a commutative ring. That is,  and, if  is an -module, 

If an -module  is flat, then  is a flat -module for every prime ideal 

These properties are fundamental in commutative algebra, since they reduce the question of flatness to the case of local rings. They are often expressed by saying that flatness is a local property.

Flat morphisms of schemes

A morphism  of schemes is a flat morphism if the induced map on local rings

Thus,  properties of flat (or faithfully flat) ring homomorphisms extends naturally to geometric properties of flat morphisms in algebraic geometry. The inclusion  then determines the flat morphism

Each (geometric) fiber  is the curve of equation  See also flat degeneration and deformation to normal cone.

Let  be a polynomial ring over a commutative Noetherian ring  and  a nonzerodivisor. Then  is flat over  if and only if  is primitive (the coefficients generate the unit ideal). Such flat extensions can be used to yield examples of flat modules that are not free and do not result from a localization.

Faithful flatness 
A module is faithfully flat if taking the tensor product with a sequence produces an exact sequence if and only if the original sequence is exact. Although the concept is defined for modules over a non-necessary commutative ring, it is used mainly for commutative algebras. So, this is the only case that is considered here, even if some results can be generalized to the case of modules over a non-commutaive ring.

In this section,  is a ring homomorphism of commutative rings, which gives to  the structures of an -algebra and an -module.

If  is flat over  the following conditions are equivalent.
  is faithfully flat.
 If  is a nonzero -module, then 

The second condition implies that a flat local homomorphism of local rings is faithfully flat. In particular, if  is a Noetherian ring, then  is also Noetherian.

See also Flat morphism#Properties of flat morphisms.

Examples
A ring homomorphism  such that  is a nonzero free -module is faithfully flat. For example:
Every field extension is faithfully flat. This property is implicitly behind the use of complexification for proving results on real vector spaces.
A polynomial ring is a faithfully flat extension of its ring of coefficients.
If  is a monic polynomial, the inclusion  is faithfully flat.

The two last examples are implicitly behind the wide use of localization in commutative algebra and algebraic geometry.

For a given ring homomorphism  there is an associated complex called the Amitsur complex:where the coboundary operators  are the alternating sums of the maps obtained by inserting 1 in each spot; e.g., . Then (Grothendieck) this complex is exact if  is faithfully flat.

Faithfully flat local homomorphisms
Here is one characterization of a faithfully flat homomorphism for a not-necessarily-flat homomorphism.

Homological characterization using Tor functors
Flatness may also be expressed using the Tor functors, the left derived functors of the tensor product. A left R-module M is flat if and only if

 for all  and all right R-modules X).
In fact, it is enough to check that the first Tor term vanishes, i.e., M is flat if and only if

Using the Tor functor's long exact sequences, one can then easily prove facts about a short exact sequence

If A and C are flat, then so is B. Also, if B and C are flat, then so is A. If A and B are flat, C need not be flat in general. However, if A is pure in B and B is flat, then A and C are flat.

Flat resolutions
A flat resolution of a module M is a resolution of the form

where the Fi are all flat modules. Any free or projective resolution is necessarily a flat resolution. Flat resolutions can be used to compute the Tor functor.

If a module M admits a finite flat resolution, the minimal length among all finite flat resolutions of M is called its flat dimension and denoted fd(M). If M does not admit a finite flat resolution, then by convention the flat dimension is said to be infinite. As an example, consider a module M such that fd(M) = 0. In this situation, the exactness of the sequence 0 → F0 → M → 0 indicates that the arrow in the center is an isomorphism, and hence M itself is flat.

In some areas of module theory, a flat resolution must satisfy the additional requirement that each map is a flat pre-cover of the kernel of the map to the right. For projective resolutions, this condition is almost invisible: a projective pre-cover is simply an epimorphism from a projective module. These ideas are inspired from Auslander's work in approximations. These ideas are also familiar from the more common notion of minimal projective resolutions, where each map is required to be a projective cover of the kernel of the map to the right. However, projective covers need not exist in general, so minimal projective resolutions are only of limited use over rings like the integers.

Flat covers

While projective covers for modules do not always exist, it was speculated that for general rings, every module would have a flat cover, that is, every module M would be the epimorphic image of a flat module F such that every map from a flat module onto M factors through F, and any endomorphism of F over M is an automoprhism. The conjecture turned out to be true, resolved positively and proved simultaneously by L. Bican, R. El Bashir and E. Enochs. This was preceded by important contributions by P. Eklof, J. Trlifaj and J. Xu.

Since flat covers exist for all modules over all rings, minimal flat resolutions can take the place of minimal projective resolutions in many circumstances.

In constructive mathematics 

Flat modules have increased importance in constructive mathematics, where projective modules are less useful. For example, that all free modules are projective is equivalent to the full axiom of choice, so theorems about projective modules, even if proved constructively, do not necessarily apply to free modules. In contrast, no choice is needed to prove that free modules are flat, so theorems about flat modules can still apply.

See also
Generic flatness
Flat morphism
von Neumann regular ring – those rings over which all modules are flat.
Normally flat ring

References 

 
 

 

 

 - page 33

Homological algebra
Algebraic geometry
Module theory